Lindsay Sue Stoecker (born April 26, 1978) is an American former professional soccer player.

Club career
Stoecker was Washington Freedom's second draft pick ahead of the inaugural 2001 season of the Women's United Soccer Association (WUSA). She missed part of the 2002 season with an anterior cruciate ligament injury. In 2003, Stoecker was part of the Freedom team who won the Founders Cup, but when the league subsequently folded she began working for a consultancy firm.

International career
In August 2001, United States national team coach April Heinrichs called up Stoecker to a 24-player preliminary roster for the 2001 Women's U.S. Cup.

References

External links

 Profile at Women's United Soccer Association
 Profile at North Carolina Tar Heels

1978 births
North Carolina Tar Heels women's soccer players
Women's association football midfielders
Living people
American women's soccer players
Soccer players from North Carolina
Washington Freedom players
Women's United Soccer Association players
Soccer players from Indiana
Women's association football central defenders